Close-Up Vol. 3, States of Being is the tenth studio album released by New York-based singer/songwriter and musician Suzanne Vega. The album consists of re-recordings of songs from Vega's back catalogue with stripped-down arrangements that highlight her lyrics and melodies. The songs included are her most haunting songs, which Suzanne used to call the "Mental Health" songs.

Recording
"Language" was recorded in January 2011, but doesn't appear in the CD track listing. "Penitent" and "Undertow" were recorded in December 2010.

Track listing

References

Suzanne Vega albums
2011 albums